The Recurvirostridae are a family of birds in the wader suborder Charadrii. It contains two distinct groups of birds, the avocets (one genus) and the stilts (two genera).

Description
All possess long, thin legs, necks, and bills. The bills of avocets are curved upwards, and are swept from side to side when the bird is feeding in the brackish or saline wetlands they prefer. The bills of stilts, in contrast, are straight. The front toes are webbed, partially in most stilts, and fully in avocets and the banded stilt, which swim more. The majority of species' plumage has contrasting areas of black and white, with some species having patches of buff or brown on the head or chest. The sexes are similar.

Their vocalizations are usually yelps of one or two syllables.

Distribution and habitat
Avocets and stilts are a cosmopolitan family, being distributed on all the world's continents except Antarctica, and occurring on several oceanic islands. Several species are wide-ranging and a few are locally distributed.

One species, the black stilt of New Zealand, is critically endangered due to habitat loss, introduced predators, and hybridisation with the pied stilt.

Feeding
These species feed on small aquatic animals such as mollusks, brine shrimp and other crustaceans, larval insects, segmented worms, tadpoles, and small fish.

Breeding
Stilts and avocets breed on open ground near water, often in loose colonies. They defend nesting territories vigorously with aggressive displays, and mob intruders and possible predators with a great deal of noise.  They are monogamous, although the pair bonds are not maintained from season to season.   Their eggs are light-coloured with dark markings, weighing . Three to four are laid in simple nests, and both parents share the incubation duties, which last 22 to 28 days. The banded stilt may breed only every few years, as it breeds on temporary lakes caused by rains in the deserts of Australia. The chicks are downy and precocial, leaving the nest within a day of hatching; they fledge in 28 to 35 days.  In all species except the banded stilt, the chicks are cared for by the parents for several months, and they may move them to new areas and defend territories there. Banded stilts deviate from this by collecting their chicks in massive crèches numbering several hundred.

Taxonomy
The taxonomy of the stilts is particularly debated, with the genus Himantopus considered to have two to six species.

References

Pierce, R.J. (1996) "Family Recurvirostridae (Stilts and Avocets) P.p. 332-348 in del Hoyo, J.; Elliot, A. & Sargatal, J. (editors). (1996). Handbook of the Birds of the World. Volume 3: Hoatzin to Auks. Lynx Edicions. 

 
Bird families
Taxa named by Charles Lucien Bonaparte